"Si loin de vous (Hey oh... par la radio)" is a song recorded by the French-born R&B singer Nâdiya and written by Thierry Gronfier, Nâdiya and Mehdy Boussaïd. It was released as the third single released from her second best-selling studio album to date, 16/9. The single was released during the fourth quarter of 2004, being released in November in France and Switzerland and in December in some several other European countries.

Inspiration
The main whistle in the melody is inspired from "Pulstar" by Vangelis, an electronic music from the 1976 album Albedo 0.39.

Chart performance
On 22 December 2004, the song was certified gold meaning over 100,000 copies were sold, one month after its release by the Syndicat National de l'Édition Phonographique, the French certifier, becoming Nâdiya's fastest certified single. In total, over 191,000 copies were sold of "Si loin de vous" in France, close to receiving a platinum certification. The song peaked at number forty-six in the 2004 French singles year-end chart (with former singles "Parle-moi" (number 22) and "Et c'est parti..." (number 30) appearing in the year-end chart too) and number 72 in the 2005 edition.

Track listings
 CD single (11:45)
 "Si loin de vous (Hey oh... par la radio)" (radio edit) — 3:55
 "Si loin de vous (Hey oh... par la radio)" (karaoke version) — 3:55
 "Si loin de vous (Hey oh... par la radio)" (video)

 Maxi single (18:14)
 "Si loin de vous (Hey oh... par la radio)" (radio edit) — 3:55
 "Si loin de vous (Hey oh... par la radio)" (6Mondini remix) — 5:33
 "Si loin de vous (Hey oh... par la radio)" (instrumental) — 3:51
 "Et c'est parti..." (6mondini remix) — 4:59

Versions and remixes
 Album version
 Radio edit
 Instrumental
 6Mondini Remix
 Karaoke version

Charts and sales

Weekly charts

Year-end charts

Certifications

References

2004 singles
Nâdiya songs
Songs written by Thierry Gronfier
2004 songs
Columbia Records singles